In the game of Go, the empty triangle is the most fundamental example of the concept of bad shape.

Three stones of one color form an empty triangle when they are placed in a triangle arrangement that fits in a 2×2 square, and when one intersection is left empty. If the triangle is filled by a stone of the opponent's at the fourth point of the 2×2, the shape is neutral – not necessarily good or bad.

The deficiencies of the empty triangle are twofold. Three stones in a straight line have eight liberties, while in an empty triangle they have only seven. This can mean the difference between success and failure in a life-and-death struggle. Also the formation lacks efficiency. In the case cited, the diagonally adjacent stones are tactically connected without the third stone, since the opponent can't prevent them from connecting unless they are ignored for a turn.

However even though the empty triangle is a prime example of bad shape, creating one could make sense, or even qualify as brilliant, in certain situations. An example of this is the third "ghost move" in the famous blood-vomiting game. The move was played by Hon'inbō Jōwa as white against Akaboshi Intetsu. The move allowed Jowa to launch a splitting attack that would ultimately lead to his victory.

The Empty Triangle is also the name of a popular series of comic panels about the game of Go that features personalities from the KGS Go Server.

See also 

 International Go Federation

References

External links
"Empty triangle" from Sensei's Library
"The empty triangle is bad" from Sensei's Library
"Full triangle" from Sensei's Library
"Good Empty Triangle" from Sensei's Library

Go shapes